John Arnold may refer to:

Politicians
John Arnold (MP for Ipswich) (died 1410), MP for Ipswich, 1388–1399
John Arnold (MP for Hampshire) (died 1433), MP for Hampshire, 1413
John Arnold (MP for Monmouthshire) (died 1606), MP for Monmouthshire, 1597
John Arnold of Monmouthshire (c. 1635–1702), Ultra-Protestant and MP for Monmouth, 1680–1689, 1695 and Southwark, 1689–1695
John H. Arnold (politician) (1862–1944), American politician; Lieutenant Governor of Ohio, 1915–1917
John W. Arnold (1842–1900), American politician; Illinois Senate, 1890–1894

Music
John Arnold (1720–1792), English music editor and composer of psalmodies in the West Gallery style
John Dent Arnold (1890–1948), American lyricist with composer Harry Baisden of World War I songs
John Ayldon (John Arnold, 1943–2013), English opera singer

Others
 John Arnold (American football) (born 1955), American football player
 John Arnold (bishop) (born 1953), English Catholic bishop
 John Arnold (cinematographer) (1889–1964), American cinematographer
 John Arnold (judge) (1915–2004), British judge
 John Arnold (priest) (born 1933), Anglican dean and author
 John Arnold (watchmaker) (1736–1799), English watchmaker and inventor, with a son named John Roger Arnold (1769–1843)
 John D. Arnold (born 1974), former Enron trader and political activist
 John E. Arnold (1913–1963), American psychologist and engineer
 John H. Arnold (historian) (born 1969), British historian and professor
 John Nelson Arnold (1834–1909), American portrait painter
 John Arnold, Australian surf entrepreneur, behind Golden Breed
 John Arnold, a character in the novel Jurassic Park
 John Arnold, perpetrator of the murder of Betty Gardner
 Johnny Arnold (1907–1984), English international footballer and test cricketer

See also
Jack Arnold (disambiguation)
Jonathan Arnold (1741–1793), American statesman and physician from Rhode Island
Jonathan Earle Arnold (1814–1869), Wisconsin politician